Dylan Parham (born August 24, 1999) is an American football offensive guard for the Las Vegas Raiders of the National Football League (NFL). He played college football at Memphis and was drafted by the Raiders in the third round of the 2022 NFL Draft.

Early life and high school
Parham grew up in Carrollton, Georgia and attended Carrollton High School, where he was a member of the basketball, football, and track and field teams. He originally played linebacker before moving to tight end before his senior season. Parham was used mostly in a blocking capacity as a senior and was named first team All-Area after nine passes for 96 yards and one touchdown and the Carrollton Trojans gained 4,200 yards of total offense. Parham was rated a two-star recruit and committed to play college football at Memphis.

College career
Parham redshirted his true freshman season at Memphis and moved from tight end to the offensive line. He was named the Tigers' starting left guard going into his redshirt freshman season. Parham started all 14 of Memphis' games in both his redshirt freshman and sophomore seasons. He was moved to the center position during spring practice after his redshirt sophomore year, but was moved again to right tackle prior to the start of the 2020 season. Parham started all 11 of the Tigers' games in 2020. He was moved to right guard going into his redshirt senior season and was named first team All-American Athletic Conference (AAC).

Professional career

Parham was selected in the third round (90th overall) by the Las Vegas Raiders in the 2022 NFL Draft.

References

External links
 Las Vegas Raiders bio
Memphis Tigers bio

1999 births
Living people
American football offensive guards
Las Vegas Raiders players
Memphis Tigers football players
People from Carrollton, Georgia
Players of American football from Georgia (U.S. state)
Sportspeople from the Atlanta metropolitan area